Franciszek Wójcicki (27 January 1900 – 2 January 1983) was a Polish politician.

Career 
He was a member of the People's Party and Polish People's Party and was elected MP during the 1947 Polish legislative election.

Family 
His granddaughters are Anne and Susan Wojcicki.

References 

1900 births
1983 deaths
Polish Jews
University of Warsaw alumni
20th-century Polish politicians
Members of the Polish Sejm 1947–1952